Varzaneh is a village in Dastjerd Rural District, Khalajastan District, Qom County, Qom Province, Iran. At the 2006 census, its population was 158, in 46 families. Approximately a hundred kilometers away from Isfahan and two hundred from Yazd, Varzaneh (ورزنه) is known for its wonderful sand dunes. The place is (not so much) frequented by tourists who are seeking the peace of a night spent in a desert and the warmth of an evening around a camp fire sitting with Iranians on a Persian carpet under the stars.

Citadel of Ghurtan 
The ancient Ghurtan old citadel is located 12km west of Varzaneh, and you can reach it directly from Isfahan, being 90km east of Isfahan city. It's located on the bank of the Zayanderud river and has survived natural disasters and many wars for 1000 years. Having very thick walls made of adobe mud brick) made it a protected complex for people living in the region. The thickness of the walls varies from 3 to 4m and they are about 9m high. The citadel has an area of 40,000 square meters. Nowadays, only four families are living inside. The citadel contains four mosques, a pigeon house, a water reservoir, a mill and many houses. It is protected by fourteen round towers and you would enter by two gateways.

References 

Populated places in Qom Province